A quasi-triangular quasi-Hopf algebra is a specialized form of a quasi-Hopf algebra defined by the Ukrainian mathematician Vladimir Drinfeld in 1989. It is also a generalized form of a quasi-triangular Hopf algebra.

A quasi-triangular quasi-Hopf algebra is a set  where  is a quasi-Hopf algebra and  known as the R-matrix, is an invertible element such that 

The quasi-Hopf algebra becomes triangular if in addition, .

Similarly to the twisting properties of the quasi-Hopf algebra, the property of being quasi-triangular or triangular quasi-Hopf algebra is preserved by twisting.

See also 
Ribbon Hopf algebra

References 
 Vladimir Drinfeld, "Quasi-Hopf algebras", Leningrad mathematical journal (1989), 1419–1457
 J. M. Maillet and J. Sanchez de Santos, "Drinfeld Twists and Algebraic Bethe Ansatz", American Mathematical Society Translations: Series 2 Vol. 201, 2000

Coalgebras